Princess Goldilocks is a 1973 Czechoslovak television musical fairytale film directed by Vlasta Janečková. It is based on a story by Karel Jaromír Erben. The film was shot at Červená Lhota Castle, Sychrov Castle and Slapy Dam.

Plot
An old King buys a snake that can enable communication with animals if eaten. His servant Jiřík has to prepare the meal for the king. The king bans Jiřík from tasting the meal, but Jiřík disobeys, and king punishes him. Jiřík has to leave his home and find a bride for his king - the beautiful Princess Goldilocks.

Cast 
Petr Štěpánek as Jiřík
Jorga Kotrbová as Goldilocks
Ladislav Pešek as King
Jiří Holý as Old King
Marie Rosůlková as Babka
Josef Bek as General

References

External links
 

1973 television films
1973 films
Czechoslovak fantasy films
1970s Czech-language films
Czech television films
Czech musical films
Czech adventure films
Czech fantasy films
Films based on works by Karel Jaromír Erben
Films based on fairy tales
1970s Czech films